John G. Carlisle (1834–1910) was a U.S. Senator from Kentucky from 1890 to 1893.

Senator Carlisle may also refer to:
Ron Carlisle (born 1940), North Dakota State Senate
Reuven Carlyle (born 1965), Washington State Senate